Disa uniflora, the red disa or pride of Table Mountain, is a South African species of orchid in the family  Orchidaceae. It is the type species of the genus Disa, and one of its best-known members. It is occasionally referred to by its old name Disa grandiflora.

Distribution 

Its range is restricted to the Sandstone Mountains of the South Western Cape, South Africa, west of Hermanus to Table Mountain and northwards into the Cederberg Mountains. It is common on Table Mountain, and the Back Table, but is rarely seen further south on the Cape Peninsula. The orchid grows near waterfalls, streamlets, and seeps in the mountains. It is, however, never found along the shores of dams whose water levels vary considerably during the year.

Description 
It is a fairly stout perennial 15 – 60 cm in height, spreading by stolons. The leaves are lance shaped, the lower ones spreading or semi-erect up to 25 cm long. The inflorescence is 1-3 flowered. The blooms are showy, and can be 10 cm across the laterally spreading sepals, which are scarlet to carmine in color. The middle, upright sepal is pinkish on the inside with scarlet veins. The petals, which are very much smaller than the sepals, are erect colored yellow with red spots at their tops, but pale scarlet at their bases. It blooms during the summer months, particularly in January, but continuing into March. Its pollination is one of the most complex of all the orchids, involving the mountain pride butterfly, Aeropetes tulbaghia.

As an emblem 
The Mountain Club of South Africa, the Western Province Rugby Team and the Western Province sports use the image of this species on their badges and logos. It has been the Mountain Club's logo since its founding in 1891. The flowers are also depicted on the obverse side of the Pro Merito Medal (1975).

Gallery

See also
 Disa Park

References

External links 
 
 

uniflora
Endemic orchids of South Africa
Taxa named by Peter Jonas Bergius